Dražen Bolić (born 12 September 1971) is a Serbian former footballer who played as a defender.

Club career
After playing for Obilić, Bolić was transferred to Partizan in 1994, spending the next four seasons with the Crno-beli. He then went abroad to Italy and signed with Serie A club Salernitana in 1998. In his debut season, Bolić played regularly for the side, but the club failed to avoid relegation to Serie B. He spent the following 10 years in the country, also playing for Ancona, Vicenza, and Lanciano.

International career
At international level, Bolić was capped seven times for FR Yugoslavia between 1995 and 2000, making his debut in a 2–0 friendly loss to Greece.

Post-playing career
After hanging up his boots, Bolić served as assistant manager to Ivan Tomić at Partizan from 2015 to 2016. He also worked as an assistant to Žarko Lazetić at Metalac Gornji Milanovac.

Career statistics

Honours
Partizan
 First League of FR Yugoslavia: 1995–96, 1996–97
 FR Yugoslavia Cup: 1997–98

References

External links
 
 
 

A.C. Ancona players
Association football defenders
Expatriate footballers in Italy
First League of Serbia and Montenegro players
FK Obilić players
FK Partizan non-playing staff
FK Partizan players
L.R. Vicenza players
Serbia and Montenegro expatriate footballers
Serbia and Montenegro expatriate sportspeople in Italy
Serbia and Montenegro footballers
Serbia and Montenegro international footballers
Serbian expatriate footballers
Serbian expatriate sportspeople in Italy
Serbian footballers
Serbs of Croatia
Serie A players
Serie B players
Sportspeople from Karlovac
S.S. Virtus Lanciano 1924 players
U.S. Salernitana 1919 players
1971 births
Living people